Encinasola is a village and municipality of Spain belonging to the province of Huelva, in the autonomous community of Andalusia. According to the 2005 census, the municipality has a population of 1,686 inhabitants.

The municipality shares a border with the Portuguese municipality of Barrancos. The details of the Spanish–Portuguese border concerning Moura, Barrancos, Encinasola and Aroche were officially settled in the 1926 Convention of Limits. By the 2010s, the demographic situation in the municipality was dire, with the 2014 population being around a 30% of the 1970 population.

The village lies at about 431 metres above sea level. The municipality spans across a total area of 177.76 km2.

People of Encinasola 
Abel Moreno: Music
, Minister of Grace and Justice with Fernando VII

References

External links
Encinasola - Sistema de Información Multiterritorial de Andalucía

Municipalities in the Province of Huelva